Raveo is a comune (municipality) in the Province of Udine in the Italian region Friuli-Venezia Giulia, located about  northwest of Trieste and about  northwest of Udine.

The municipality of Raveo contains the frazione (subdivision) Esemon di Sopra.

Raveo borders the following municipalities: Enemonzo, Lauco, Ovaro, Socchieve, Villa Santina.

Demographic evolution

References

Cities and towns in Friuli-Venezia Giulia